Janicki (feminine: Janicka; plural: Janiccy) is a Polish surname. It may refer to:

 Aleksander Janicki (born 1963), Polish artist
 Don Janicki (born 1960), American long-distance runner
 Greg Janicki (born 1984), American soccer player
 Jagna Janicka (born 1959), Polish costume and scene designer
 Jerzy Janicki (1928–2007), Polish writer
 Jerzy Stanisław Janicki (born 1956), Polish physicist
 Klemens Janicki (1516–1543), Polish poet
 Michał Janicki (born 1982), Polish footballer
 Rafał Janicki (born 1992), Polish footballer
 Robert Janicki (born 1997), Polish footballer
 Sławomir Janicki (born 1980), Polish ice dancer

See also
 

Polish-language surnames